Cédric Moukouri Mambingo (born 29 October 1979 in Gonesse, Val-d'Oise), known as Cédric Moukouri, is a French football player who plays in Réunion for Saint-Pauloise.

He played for Portuguese outfit Trofense after signing from Marítimo in 2007 and formerly playing for French club RC Strasbourg. He was a key player for the Ligue 1 outfit but the club could not avoid relegation and in the summer, Cedric left for Marítimo.

References

 
 Career summary by playerhistory.com

1979 births
Living people
People from Gonesse
French footballers
French expatriate footballers
Expatriate footballers in Portugal
Expatriate footballers in Luxembourg
Expatriate footballers in Cyprus
Ligue 1 players
Championnat National 2 players
Primeira Liga players
Cypriot First Division players
RC Strasbourg Alsace players
AS Cherbourg Football players
C.S. Marítimo players
FC Etzella Ettelbruck players
Villemomble Sports players
JA Drancy players
C.D. Trofense players
Enosis Neon Paralimni FC players
Association football forwards
Footballers from Val-d'Oise